Maria da Graça Station is a subway station on the Rio de Janeiro Metro that services the neighbourhood of Maria da Graça in the North Zone of Rio de Janeiro.

References

Metrô Rio stations
Railway stations opened in 1983
1983 establishments in Brazil